Balgus is a genus of click beetle (family Elateridae). They are one of several genera in the family which contain at least one bioluminescent species. The genus was originally placed in the family Eucnemidae, later transferred to Throscidae, but recent classifications establish them firmly within Elateridae.

List of species
 Balgus albofasciatus (Bonvouloir, 1875)
 Balgus egaensis (Bonvouloir, 1875) [= "eganensis"]  
 Balgus eschscholtzi (Laporte, 1835)
 Balgus humilis (Bonvouloir, 1875)
 Balgus obconicus (Bonvouloir, 1875)
 Balgus rugosus (Blanchard, 1843)
 Balgus schnusei (Heller, 1914)
 Balgus subfasciatus (Bonvouloir, 1875)
 Balgus tuberculosus (Dalman, 1823)

References

Elateridae genera
Bioluminescent insects